/Garib Dassi is sampraday divided into two parts, Nadi and Bindi. Bindi is headed by Mahant Dayasagar Ji from Chhudani Dham, Haryana while Saints comes under Nadi, headed by Swami Brahmanand ji Bhuriwale in Dham Raqba Sahib in the Ludhiana district of Punjab. He was the third head of Bhuriwale Sampradha. He works for the betterment of poor, cow and girls. That is why he had opened several educational institutes specially in the rural area of Hoshiarpur, S.B.S. Nagar, Ropar and Ludhiana for educating girls. He preferred building the Temple of Knowledge rather than religious temples. For that he had established Maharaj Bhuriwale Garib Dassi Educational Trust in 1984.

He has been honoured by the Governor of Punjab(India) for his notable contribution to the field of education. He has follow the path of Guru Shri Satguru Garib Dass Ji of Chhudani Dham, Haryana
Jagat Guru Garib Dass Maharaj adopted Maharaj Kabir Ji as his Guru and thus the religious lineage of Garib Dassi Sect is connected with Kabir Ji through Acharya Ramanuj. That is why Garib dassi is related to kabir Panth

Swami Brahmanand has anoints one of his disciples, Vedhant Acharya Swami Chetna Nand ji Bhuriwale as his successor which is the present head of this Divine Seat.
अधिकारिक वेबसाइट सर्वोच्य गरीबदासीय पीठ श्री छतरी साहिब छुडानी धाम जिला झज्जर हरियाणा .

पाठी पंडित प्रेम सिंह जी गरीबदासीय ई-ग्रंथालय

External links
 Report on Swami Brahmanand Bhuriwale, Master of the Garib Dassi sect in Tribune, Chandigarh

20th-century Hindu religious leaders